Charles Rabaey (born 30 October 1934) is a former Belgian cyclist. He competed in the team pursuit at the 1960 Summer Olympics.

References

External links
 

1934 births
Living people
Belgian male cyclists
Olympic cyclists of Belgium
Cyclists at the 1960 Summer Olympics
Cyclists from West Flanders
People from Wingene
20th-century Belgian people